Chan Vathanaka (born 23 January 1994) is a Cambodian professional footballer who plays as a forward for Boeung Ket FC and for the Cambodia national team. He is known for his pace, skills, and ability to score free kick goals.

Club career

Preah Khan
Vathanaka played for the senior team of Preah Khan Reach F.C. during the 2011–12 season.

Boeung Ket Angkor
Vathanaka signed a contract with Boeung Ket in 2012.

On 1 August 2015, Vathanaka scored all six goals in a 6–0 win over Asia Europe United. Impressively, this was not even his best accomplishment; in a 12–2 over Kirivong Sok Sen Chey on 11 July 2015 Vathanaka scored eight goals, the highest tally for a Cambodian-born player in the league, as well as giving him 16 goals in the first 8 games of the 2015 season.

In the semifinals of the 2015 Mekong Club Championship Vathanaka scored all three goals in a 3–2 win over Becamex Bình Dương, putting Boeung Ket Angkor in the final. Although Boeung Ket Angkor lost in the final to Buriram United, Vathanaka finished the tournament as the highest goalscorer, with five goals, and was also named best player.

Vathanaka finished the 2015 league season with 35 goals, a total of 55 goals in all competitions including national and club, the most of any Southeast Asian player.

In his first start of the 2016 season Vathanaka scored a hat-trick in under five minutes as Boeung Ket Angkor beat CMAC FC 6–0.

In a match against Svay Rieng on 21 May 2016 Vathanaka scored goals in the 85th, 89th, and 90+3rd minute as his team came from behind to win 3–1. The first goal, an audacious left-foot volley from a cross, was touted of one of the goals of the 2016 season.

Vathanaka finished the 2016 Cambodian League as the top scorer for the second consecutive year with 22 goals, as his team Boeung Ket Angkor dramatically won the title on the last match day by a single point.

Fujiyeda MYFC
During the 2016 season, Vathanaka was loaned out to J3 League side Fujiyeda MYFC. Donning his iconic number 11 shirt, Vathanaka didn't start a single game during his loan spell there, making only a single last minute substitution.

Pahang FA
In December 2017 Vathanaka signed for Pahang FA for the upcoming season after a disappointing spell in Japan. He has since been released from Pahang FA to be replaced by Issey Nakajima in an article by FOX Sports Asia.

PKNS FC
After Vathanaka was released from Pahang FA, Vathanaka came back to Cambodia to rejoin his former club Boeung Ket Angkor.

On 18 January 2019, PKNS FC signed Vathanaka on a free contract according to an Article. He was given the number 29 jersey instead of number 11 in which his famous CV11 became CV29. This was by far his most successful season playing oversea where he made over 13 appearances in the Liga Super. He only made 10 appearances at Pahang FA in that same league.

International career
He made his senior international debut on 22 March 2013 in a 2014 AFC Challenge Cup qualification match against Turkmenistan.

Vathanaka played an important part in Cambodia's campaign in the 2018 World Cup qualification. In the first qualifying game he came off the bench to score two goals, the second a thunderous free-kick, in a 3–0 home win over Macau. On 28 July 2016 Vathanaka scored another free kick against Singapore in a friendly match.

He was part of the Cambodian national team for the 2016 AFF Cup and scored two goals against Malaysia in the group stage. He went on to represent the Koupreys in two more AFF Cups.

Club statistics
Updated 4 February 2018.

International

International goals

Senior
Scores and results list Cambodia's goal tally first.

Under-23

Honours

Club
Boeung Ket 
 Cambodian League: 2016, 2017
Hun Sen Cup: 2019
 2015 Mekong Club Championship: Runner up

Individual
2012 Cambodia Best Young Player of the Year 
2013 Hun Sen Cup Golden Boot
2014 Cambodian League Most Valuable Player
2015 Cambodian League Most Valuable Player
2015 Cambodian League Golden Boot
2015 Mekong Club Championship: Most Valuable Player
2016 Cambodian League Most Valuable Player
2016 Cambodian League Golden Boot
2017 FFC Best Player of The Year

Personal life
Since October 2015 Vathanaka has celebrated goals by kissing a tattoo on his right arm. The tattoo is a memorial to his parents and family. Vathanaka also has a passion for karaoke and music; when he was injured in September 2015 he spent seven hours singing and recording songs with Cambodian singer Meas Soksophea.

In January 2016 Vathanaka became a goodwill ambassador for the cellphone company SEATEL.

References

External links

 
 

 Profile at Fujieda MYFC

1994 births
Living people
Cambodian footballers
Cambodia international footballers
Association football midfielders
Preah Khan Reach Svay Rieng FC players
Boeung Ket Rubber Field players
Fujieda MYFC players
J3 League players
Cambodian expatriate footballers
Expatriate footballers in Japan
Cambodian expatriate sportspeople in Japan
People from Kampot province